was a Japanese animation studio founded in August 1993 by former Toei Animation staff.

Hal Film Maker's parent company, TYO Inc., merged its two anime studio subsidiaries—Yumeta Company and Hal Film Maker—on July 1, 2009. Yumeta Company absorbed Hal Film Maker and changed its name to TYO Animations before reverting to Yumeta Company on December 1, 2017.

Works

Television series

Other works

References

External links
 

 
Japanese companies established in 1993
Mass media companies established in 1993
Mass media companies disestablished in 2009
Japanese animation studios
Japanese companies disestablished in 2009